The 2006 Columbia Lions football team was an American football team that represented Columbia University during the 2006 NCAA Division I FCS football season. Columbia tied for last in the Ivy League. 

In their first season under head coach Norries Wilson, the Lions compiled a 5–5 record and were outscored 163 to 150. Matt Barsamian, Adam Brekke and Uche Osadebe were the team captains.  

The Lions' 2–5 conference record placed them in a three-way tie for sixth in the Ivy League standings. Columbia was outscored 135 to 66 by Ivy opponents. 

Columbia played its homes games at Lawrence A. Wien Stadium in Upper Manhattan, in New York City.

Schedule

References

Columbia
Columbia Lions football seasons
Columbia Lions football